John Jumper, based in London, is a senior research scientist at DeepMind Technologies. John Jumper and his colleagues at DeepMind in London 2021 released AlphaFold, which uses artificial intelligence (AI) to predict protein structures with stunning accuracy. John Jumper recently stated that in the coming months, the AlphaFold team plans to release 100 million protein structures. The scientific journal  Nature included John Jumper as one of the ten "people who mattered" in science in their annual listing of Nature's 10 2021.

For 2022 he received the Wiley Prize in Biomedical Sciences and also for 2022 the BBVA Foundation Frontiers of Knowledge Award in the category "Biology and Biomedicine". For 2023 he received the Breakthrough Prize in Life Sciences for developing AlphaFold, which accurately predicts the structure of a protein. He and his team have been working on Alpha Fold for the past few years, and their efforts have finally paid off. In November 2020, Alpha Fold was named the winner of the Critical Assessment of Structure Prediction (CASP) competition. This prestigious competition pits algorithms against each other to determine which one can best predict the 3D structure of proteins. Alpha Fold won the competition, beating out all of the other algorithms and making it the first machine learning algorithm to be able to accurately predict the 3D structure of proteins. John and his team are now working on improving Alpha Fold and making it even more accurate. They’re also exploring ways to use Alpha Fold to develop new treatments for diseases and create new materials with unique properties.

What is Alpha Fold? 

Alpha Fold is a machine learning algorithm developed by John Jumper and his team at DeepMind, a research lab owned by Google’s parent company Alphabet. The algorithm is designed to help scientists understand how proteins fold. It does this by using artificial intelligence to analyze massive amounts of data, including protein sequences and 3D structures. The algorithm then uses this information to predict how proteins will fold in the future. The idea behind Alpha Fold is to provide scientists with a way to better understand and predict how proteins will fold in the future. This could help researchers develop new treatments for diseases and create new materials with unique properties.

References

Living people
Artificial intelligence researchers
Molecular biology
Proteomics
Applications of artificial intelligence
Applied machine learning
Protein folding
Year of birth missing (living people)